Teté (24 August 1907 – 18 June 1962) was a Brazilian football manager who coached Brazil national team for some games in 1956. He also coached Sport Club Internacional during the 1950s.

Biography 
Teté was a major coach of football in Rio Grande do Sul. Became known as the "Marshal of Victories," because he was an officer of the Army Reserve.

As a player, he served in the 9º Regimento. Then trained the Farroupilha (after the change of club name), Pelotas Brazil Guarany of Bagé, General Osorio Cruzeiro-RS Nacional-RS and Internacional .

In Internacional, Teté did well. He coached the team from 1951 to 1957 and was four-time Gaucho (51, 52, 53 and 55). Also coached Brazil national team, became champion of the Pan American of 1956 in Mexico.

References 

Sportspeople from Rio Grande do Sul
Brazilian football managers
1907 births
1962 deaths
Botafogo de Futebol e Regatas players
Grêmio Esportivo Brasil managers
Sport Club Internacional managers
Brazil national football team managers
Esporte Clube São José managers
Brazilian footballers
Association footballers not categorized by position